Raykov is a surname. Notable people with the surname include:

Georgi Raykov (1953–2006), Bulgarian wrestler
Kiril Raykov (born 1969), Bulgarian sprinter
Marin Raykov (born 1960), Bulgarian politician and diplomat
Simeon Raykov (born 1989), Bulgarian footballer

Bulgarian-language surnames